Gandey Assembly constituency   is an assembly constituency in  the Indian state of Jharkhand.

Members of Assembly 
1977: Laxman Swarnkar, Janata Party
1980: Sarfaraz Ahmad, Indian National Congress
1985: Salkhan Soren, Jharkhand Mukti Morcha
1990: Salkhan Soren, Jharkhand Mukti Morcha
1995: Laxman Swarnkar, Bharatiya Janata Party
2000: Salkhan Soren, Jharkhand Mukti Morcha
2005: Salkhan Soren, Jharkhand Mukti Morcha
2009: Sarfaraz Ahmad, Indian National Congress
2014: Jai Prakash Verma, Bharatiya Janata Party
2019: Sarfaraz Ahmad, Jharkhand Mukti Morcha

See also
Vidhan Sabha
List of states of India by type of legislature

References

Assembly constituencies of Jharkhand